Western is a surname. Notable people with the surname include:

 Albert Western (1923–1987), Australian rules footballer
 Andrew Western (born 1985), British politician
 Anne Western (born 1955), English politician
 Bruce Western (born 1964), Australian-born American sociologist
 Edward Western (1845–1919), English cricketer
 Franklin Western (born 1972), basketball player
 Frederick Western (1880–1951), Anglican bishop
 Joel Western (born 2002), Australian rules footballer
 John Western (1931–2011), Australian academic and author
 Johnny Western (born 1934), American country singer-songwriter
 Jon Western (1963–2022), American political scholar
 Lucille Western (1843–1877), American stage actress
 Matt Western (born 1962), British politician
 Mike Western (1925–2008), British comics artist
 Phil Western (1971–2019), Canadian musician
 Samuel Western (1652–1699), English politician